Barea consignatella is a moth of the family Oecophoridae. It is found in Australia and New Zealand. It is brown and has brownish-grey markings.

References

Oecophorinae
Moths of Australia
Moths of New Zealand
Moths described in 1864